Juan Carlos Patarroyo is a Colombian engineer and the chairman of Atletico Huila of the Categoría Primera A. He previously served as the club's vice president and is a stalwart upon its executive board.

References

Colombian engineers
Living people
Year of birth missing (living people)